Northern Hearts is an association football club based in Timaru, New Zealand. The club was founded in 1947 and from 1982 to 1990 was amalgamated with Timaru City as South Canterbury United. It reverted to Northern Hearts in 1991.

Northern Hearts competed in the various Southern Premier leagues from 1971 to the mid-2000s. The club's best end-of-season position came in 2001, when they finished as runners-up in the premiership. 

Northern Hearts first competed for the Chatham Cup in 1947. 

Northern Hearts best Chatham Cup performance came in 1980, when it reached the last 16 before losing 2–5 to eventual finalists Dunedin City.

References

External links
FootballSouth Northern Hearts page

Association football clubs in New Zealand
Sport in Timaru
1947 establishments in New Zealand